Orlando Coleman (born September 9, 1992) is an American professional basketball player for BC Enisey of the VTB United League.

High School career 
Coleman played with Pleasant Grove High School, in Birmingham, Alabama.

College career 
Coleman played college basketball with the Morehead State, Alabama Southern CC, Kennesaw State and Texas Southern. As a senior at Texas Southern, he averaged 6.4 points and 4 rebounds per game.

Professional career
After going undrafted in the 2016 NBA draft, Coleman signed with the KW Titans of the NBL Canada. Later that year, he also played for Centauros de Chihuahua and Caballeros de Culiacán in Mexico. The following year, Coleman joined Radnički Kragujevac in Serbia. On April 2, 2018, Coleman joined Southland Sharks of the NBZL. with the Sharks, Coleman won the 2018 New Zealand NBL championship.

From 2018 to 2020, Coleman played with Jászberényi KSE and Atomerőmű SE in Hungary. 

During the end of the 2019–20 season, he had a short stint with Maccabi Kiryat Motzkin in Israel.

The following season, he returned to Jászberényi KSE, where he became the Top Scorer of the Hungarian League. During the season, he averaged 25 points, 6.6 rebounds and 2.9 assists per game.

On July 19, 2021, Coleman joined Apollon Patras of the Greek Basket League. In his debut with the team, he scored 22 points and grabbed 9 rebounds in a home win against Ionikos Nikaias. In a total of 9 games with the Greek club, Coleman averaged 17.3 points, 4.9 rebounds, and 1.3 assists per contest. 

On January 8, 2022, he signed with Champagne Châlons-Reims of the LNB Pro A.

References

External links
6thMan bio

1992 births
Living people
American expatriate basketball people in France
American expatriate basketball people in Greece
American expatriate basketball people in Hungary
American expatriate basketball people in Israel
American expatriate basketball people in Mexico
American expatriate basketball people in New Zealand
American expatriate basketball people in Serbia
Apollon Patras B.C. players
Atomerőmű SE players
Basketball League of Serbia players
Basketball players from Birmingham, Alabama
Caballeros de Culiacán players
Champagne Châlons-Reims Basket players
Jászberényi KSE players
Kennesaw State Owls men's basketball players
KW Titans players
KKK Radnički players
Maccabi Kiryat Motzkin basketball players
Shooting guards
Small forwards
Southland Sharks players
Texas Southern Tigers men's basketball players